AlDub is a Philippine supercouple which first appeared in the Kalyeserye portion of the "Juan for All, All for Juan" segment of the variety show Eat Bulaga! They were also called as the "phenomenal love team" due to their rise in popularity after they were accidentally paired on the July 16, 2015 episode of the Problem Solving portion of "Juan for All, All for Juan" which later became the first episode of Kalyeserye. AlDub was derived from a portmanteau of the tandem's character names in Kalyeserye, namely Filipino actor Alden Richards, who portrays a fictionalized version of himself, and Yaya Dub (Divina Ursula Bokbokova Smash, a playful reverse-acronym of Dubsmash), portrayed by Dubsmash Queen personality and socialite actress Maine Mendoza, who initially does not talk and interacts through lip-syncing.

Both joining the program's cast in 2015, Richards first appeared as a host of Eat Bulaga! segments, such as the "That's My Bae" portion; while Mendoza originally appeared as Yaya Dub in the show's portion "Problem Solving". During the first few months of Kalyeserye, they exclusively interacted through the show's split screen frame, the AlDub couple's main communication is through lip syncing audio clips from popular songs, films and TV series.  After they personally met in September 2015 and Yaya Dub was later allowed to speak, the couple's interaction is no longer limited to split screen and lip-syncing.

Outside Kalyeserye, they're still referred to as AlDub even if they are no longer portraying their Kalyeserye characters. They have been product endorsers and have appeared in films, notably My Bebe Love: #KiligPaMore and their very first solo film Imagine You and Me.

In 2017, AlDub starred in the romantic comedy teleserye Destined to Be Yours, which aired from February 27, 2017, until May 26, 2017.

Background

A 30-minute to 1-hour soap opera parody entitled Kalyeserye (literally translated as "street series") was created within the "Juan for All, All for Juan"s segment for the tandem, featuring live improv acting from the AlDub supercouple and its additional characters–Filipino comedians Wally Bayola (primarily as Lola Nidora), Jose Manalo (primarily as Lola Tinidora), and Paolo Ballesteros (primarily as Lola Tidora) as various characters. The segment proved to be a success in both broadcast television and social media, resulting in a significant increase of viewership and popularity of Eat Bulaga!. In addition, it has also contributed to the careers of Richards and Mendoza.

As of late, different media outlets had hailed AlDub as a "social media phenomenon" following its success in trending everyday on Twitter and other social media platforms. Record-breaking tweets correlate to a pivotal episode of Kalyeserye, mostly about AlDub's continuing romance. Such is the case on September 5, 2015, as the couple finally saw each other for the first time after their respective performances in the Bulaga Pa More! Dabarkads Edition wildcard round. Subsequent meetings for the pair happened in the weeks that followed, advancing the storyline of Kalyeserye.

On September 26, 2015, they first reached record-breaking tweets on Twitter for #ALDubEBforLOVE with 25.6 million tweets in just a day, breaking their own record of 12.1 million tweets within 24 hours for #ALDUBMostAwaitedDate on September 19, 2015.

On October 24, 2015, the couple finally got to meet properly without hindrances through Eat Bulaga!s grand benefit concert at the Philippine Arena dubbed as "Sa Tamang Panahon" ("At the Right Time"). The concert was part of the show's 36th anniversary and held as a celebration to Eat Bulaga! and a tribute to the fans of AlDub. Proceeds were used to fund libraries for certain schools across the Philippines. That day, the hashtag #ALDubEBTamangPanahon reached over 41 million tweets within 24 hours (which is now the global record for the most number of tweets within 24 hours), beating the record of the 2014 World Cup semi-final match between Brazil and Germany, which consists of 37.6 million tweets within 24 hours.  Rishi Jaitly, one of the executives of Twitter said that the tweets were "real, fresh and organic." Apart of social media records, the concert also recorded a live audience of 55,000 people and set another record after tickets for the event sold out in less than 3 days.

Beginnings
In 2015, Alden Richards, who had finished filming the miniseries Ilustrado (2014), was invited to join Eat Bulaga! as a host for a month-long trial period, hosting various segments such as "Pak Na Pak" and later, "That's My Bae" with Indian-Filipino radio disc jockey Sam YG. A month later, Maine Mendoza, who had initially gained popularity for posting Dubsmash videos in various social media platforms, auditioned for the program after catching the attention of its producers. Mendoza officially entered showbiz on July 4, 2015. She recalled that she was originally cast as a lawyer for Eat Bulaga!s "Juan for All, All for Juan" segment but was ultimately cast as Yaya Dub (Divina Ursula Bokbokova Smash), a personal assistant (although the Filipino term Yaya translate to nanny) for comedian 's Lola Nidora character. Utilizing her Dubsmash popularity, Mendoza only communicates in the series through vocal dubbing and was initially portrayed as the snobbish Yaya Dub. On the show's July 16, 2015 episode, Yaya Dub broke character when she was caught being kilig (a Tagalog word roughly translated in English as "feeling giddy" or much closer with the idiom "tickled pink") seeing Richards on the show's live split screen, prompting Eat Bulagas producers to make an onscreen couple of the two. On October 1, 2015, their first duet happened when Maine Mendoza and Alden Richards sang "Wish I May", a song by the latter, and "God Gave Me You", a hit song by Bryan White. Mike Tuviera, a resident director for the show, revealed that the tandem was made by accident. The name "AlDub" was conceived as a portmanteau of the tandem's names, Alden and Yaya Dub And despite being featured in the show, the couple did not meet with each other for the first few weeks of the segment and only interacted through the show's split-screen frame and conversing in dubbed audio samples of popular songs and lines from popular films and TV series as well as through handwritten messages shown on screen.

Kalyeserye

Due to the audiences' positive reception to the AlDub pairing, Eat Bulaga!s producers decided to make a 30-minute soap opera parody in its "Juan For All, All for Juan" segment for the tandem. Pegged as a "Kalyeserye" (Filipino for "street series"), it was described as a parody of Philippine television dramas performed by improv acting, which was broadcast live from a barangay street featured in the "Juan for All, All for Juan" set. Poochie Rivera, one of the program's directors, described it as "natural and unscripted", saying that "Nothing is rehearsed. We are trying to maintain the spontaneity because that is a big part of its charm.". Starring the AlDub love team, the Kalyeserye also features Jose Manalo (as Frankie Arinolli, Tinidora and his various characters), Wally Bayola (as Lola Nidora and his various characters), Paolo Ballesteros (as Tidora and his various characters) and other casts and characters.

Some of the running gags and storylines throughout the parody include the "Pabebe Wave" (a deviation of a beauty queen wave gesture) between Alden and Yaya Dub, Lola Nidora lobbying for a pairing between Yaya Dub and Frankie (using the portmanteau "YaKie"), and the incompetence of the numerous Rogelios, Lola Nidora's bodyguards. The Kalyeserye's main storyline is the Cinderella-like forbidden courtship between the AlDub tandem, with its paramount goal being the first physical meeting between the two, a move continually opposed by Lola Nidora.

"Tamang Panahon"

On the October 24, 2015 episode of Eat Bulaga!, approximately 55,000 people gathered at the Philippine Arena for a benefit concert that highlighted the love team of Maine Mendoza and Alden Richards. One hundred percent of ticket sales (Php 14 million) was allotted for the AlDub Library Outreach Project. With 41 million in total tweets within 24 hours (39.4 million in 24 hours on October 24 with remaining tweets from the following day considered as counted by Twitter itself), #ALDubEBTamangPanahon, the official hashtag of the event, broke their own Twitter record as well as breaking the global record for the most number of tweets within 24 hours previously held by the 2014 FIFA World Cup semi-final match between Brazil and Germany (which only gained 37.6 million tweets).
Once again their television rating soared, this time beating the level of the Manny Pacquiao fights, posting a stunning 50.8 percent in Mega Manila and 40.1 percent nationwide.
And this is the only time where Eat Bulaga (if not the only TV show) broadcast the show live and commercial-free.

Films
Beyond Kalyeserye, the AlDub love team has appeared in two films portraying different characters separate from their roles in Kalyeserye.

My Bebe Love

Their first full-length movie entitled My Bebe Love, entered into the 2015 Metro Manila Film Festival was the top grosser with an opening-day gross of 60.5 million Philippine pesos. By day 5 it had grossed some 214 million pesos On the 10th day of 41st MMFF, the movie had earned P322 million pesos. The total gross of the movie is 385 million pesos.

At the Metro Manila Film Festival awards night, Maine Mendoza won the title of Best Supporting actress.

Imagine You and Me

On July 13, 2016, three days before the anniversary of AlDub, Imagine You and Me was shown in cinemas worldwide as an anniversary gift to the fans of AlDub. In the film, Richards and Mendoza played as star-crossed lovers with the opposite view of love. A great majority of the film was shot in Italy and the Cinema Evaluation Board of the Philippines gave a B grade. The film grossed over PHP21.5 million on its first day making it the highest-grossing opening day in 2016 to date.

Love is...

On October 21, 2017, the AlDub love team starred in Eat Bulaga!s "film made for television" titled Love is..., directed by Adolf Alix, Jr.

"The first ever telemovie that will redefine love, promise, and commitment. The story that will tell us what ‘love is.’"

Reception

The AlDub couple became an overnight phenomenon on both television and social media. The pivotal meeting episode between the AlDub tandem on August 8, 2015 scored a 32% percent rating and a 300% increase in viewership for Eat Bulaga! in the Mega Manila Region, according to the Nielsen ratings conducted by AGB Nielsen Philippines. On a weekly survey by Kantar Media Philippines, the tandem was cited in helping the program to become a number one daytime program for weeks. According to AGB Nielsen's research, Eat Bulaga!s August 12, 2015 episode marked an all-time high in viewership for the year with a 36.1% rating, in the Mega Manila Region, which was mainly alluded to the tandem's near-meeting. Rivera also theorized that the coupling's successful response from audiences was because of the Filipinos who can relate with their predicament. He remarked "People who have partners who work abroad often communicate and pursue their relationship online, through Skype or FaceTime." Pauleen Luna, a cast member of Eat Bulaga!, commented that AlDub "has brought a different kind of energy to the show." Anna Leah Sarabia, a Filipino anthropologist, cited the "Kalyeserye"'s use of fairy tale and soap opera's tropes helped in tandem's increasing popularity, saying that "It’s a 'Cinderella' story that's fake and true-life at the same time." Filipino television executive Malou Choa-Fagar also cited the unpredictable nature of the Kalyeserye had largely contributed to the AlDub success. In social media site Twitter, hashtags with AlDub became top trending topics in both the Philippine and Worldwide trends. Various outlets also lauded the show's use of old and new media for the AlDub tandem, which also pulsated in raising the value of the Dubsmash app in the Philippines. The popularity of the tandem even reached some schools and became a topic discussed in classrooms; for instance in a University of the Philippines Diliman Filipino class. Several Filipino politicians also referenced the AlDub couple in various interviews: Ralph Recto cited the tandem as a symbolism regarding the Philippine Land Transportation Office license plates, while Mar Roxas also referenced AlDub in his 2016 presidential campaign.

The success of the AlDub tandem also contributed to the careers of Richards and Mendoza. The AlDub's success has helped Richards secure a four-year film contract with APT Entertainment and a recording deal with GMA Records, while the Philippine Basketball Association teams Barangay Ginebra San Miguel, Mahindra Enforcers and Talk N' Text Tropang Texters was also reported to have been considering inviting Mendoza as their muse for the 2015–16 PBA season but she turned down. Mendoza and Richards also appeared in separate profile interviews regarding the AlDub's success on the television program Kapuso Mo, Jessica Soho, Richards also had an episode of his life story on Magpakailanman. Tuviera also revealed in an interview about a possibility of making 2015 feature film starring the AlDub couple. Another report also confirmed that Richards and Mendoza will be part of 41st Metro Manila Film Festival entry My Bebe Love starring Vic Sotto and Ai Ai delas Alas. It also started taping two commercials, for Talk N' Text and McDonald's, they were also awarded the Most Popular Breakout Love Team of the Year, in the recently concluded EdukCircle Awards.

AlDub tandem had granted the request, that they will not endorse any politicians running for the 2016 presidential election in which senator Tito Sotto, one of the main hosts said as per advice from the Eat Bulaga's management.

The two also scored magazine covers due to insistent public demands. The two were featured on YES! Magazine's November 2015 issue and for Preview magazine, Maine on Meg, and Alden for Megaman. The Tres Lolas (JoWaPao) were also featured in another celebrity magazine for the same month.

Social media
From 3.5 million tweets in 24 hours, the AlDub Twitter following grew exponentially, it doubled to 6 million plus on September 5, 2015, doubling further to 12 million on September 19, 2015, and On September 26, 2015, they have reached the highest tweets in Twitter for #ALDubEBforLOVE with 25.6 million tweets in just a day, breaking their own record of 12.1 million tweets within 24 hours for #ALDUBMostAwaitedDate on September 19. Both episodes of the Kalyeserye marked special milestones for the relationship of the AlDub supercouple. They even surpassed the 25.6 million tweets when the two have their #ALDubEBTamangPanahon in the Philippine Arena last October 24, 2015 with a whooping 41 million tweets. Their television rating also went over the roof going to the level of the Manny Pacquiao fights posting a high 45.7 percent in Mega Manila, while Philippine wide rating was at 30.8 percent.

Rishi Jaitly, Twitter's Vice President of Media, Asia Pacific and Middle East, said that AlDub is a global phenomenon.  He initially thought that tweets were not authentic but after internally checking it, he concluded that phenomenon is real and not a sideshow.

AlDub has gained the global record for the most tweeter feed in 24 hours. Some sectors has referred to the phenomenon as an example of a black swan event.

The "AlDub Nation" fandom

Fans of AlDub are commonly referred to as "AlDub Nation", tagging the word nation as it was able to capture three large audiences: overseas workers, people who are often at home (Team Bahay, as they are called), and millennials. These captive audiences factor greatly in the invention and reinvention of AlDub as a phenomenon. The fandom's large amount in numbers is one main reason to contributing to AlDub's success.

In general, the AlDub Nation has established fan club chapters coming from the Philippines and abroad. As of date, there is an estimated number of 43 local chapters within the country and 44 international chapters from all over the world.

A netizen who goes by his moniker “Don Simoun Ibarra” is one of the sources of Lola Nidora's old pictures, which have garnered thousands of likes and shares on Facebook and Twitter also founded a Twitter-based fan club of working professionals called "AlDub Elite". In an interview with INQUIRER.net, Don Simoun, who chose not to reveal his real identity, admitted that he is a certified “AlDub” fan. “I am very inspired with the “hidden message” behind the story as well as Lola Nidora's lessons of LOVE. It is a lesson that the youth of today should always keep in mind,” he said.

The AlDub verified page on Facebook (username: facebook.com/aldenandyayadub) has over 1,000,000 likers; and the fan club with the highest number of followers on Twitter (handle: @MaineAlden16) has over 700,000 followers – numbers which may potentially increase as AlDub's popularity has yet to show signs of waning.

On Saturday (October 24), records were broken when the hashtag #ALDUBEBTamangPanahon resonated all over the world, resulting in 41 million tweets sent. While a lot of tweets came from the Philippines, there was a large number of tweets from the East and West Coasts of the U.S., Japan, Europe, and the Middle East. Two-thirds of all the tweets came from outside of the Philippines.

In an interview from CNN Philippines, it was said that the reason why AlDub-related hashtags work is because of teamwork between different fan clubs on Twitter. There were subgroups which had primary goals such as hashtag trendsetters that sets up hashtags for the day to be used during the show, statistics to monitor tweet counts, hashtag policies that guards the fandom by making sure that they use the correct hashtag and its spelling, and its fandom and character parody accounts that help the fandom to communicate and keep on tweeting.

Eat Bulaga has raised P14 million from ticket sales from the "Tamang Panahon" concert for its library project. Wally Bayola, in character as Lola Nidora, announced this on Saturday during the opening segment of the noontime show. Powered by the AlDub phenomenon with the thrust of AlDub Nation, Eat Bulaga sold out the 55,000-seat Philippine Arena in just three days. The show earlier said it was donating 100 percent of the proceeds from the show to its project which aims to build "AlDub Libraries" at selected schools nationwide. Fans who were unable to buy tickets were also given the opportunity to donate to the project.

Outside of the series, AlDub Nation had also used their hashtags to participate in community service or "bayanihans" and other good deeds. Among them were supporting the campaign to stop lumad killings, gathering donations for a book drive for lumad children, charity concerts for the Mangyans, outreach and feeding programs, and an awareness campaign for dengue prevention.

Cultural impact

Sociological analysis
On Chika Minute of GMA News' 24 Oras, sociologist Brother Clifford Sorita linked the positive audience reception of the AlDub to the Yaya Dub's Cinderella complex. Sorita says that many can relate to Yaya Dub's situation, portrayed as an ordinary woman who hopes for someone popular or a "prince charming" (Alden Richards) to notice her. Sonita also described that Maine Mendoza, who portrays the character of Yaya Dub as a "diamond in the rough" an ordinary person whose talent and potential maybe discovered through ordinary means. Mendoza was discovered through the internet through her Dubsmash videos.

Cultural references
The Manila Times in an editorial cartoon depicted that many national issues in the Philippines are being permanently ignored because of the popularity of AlDub, Korean dramas and K-pop in the Philippines.

Awards
People Asia Magazine hailed Alden Richards and Maine Mendoza as People of the Year 2016.  Guinness World Records recognized AlDub as record-breaker in Twitter history for generating 40,706,392 tweets in the "Tamang Panahon" event in Philippine Arena. They are the only celebrity pair in the world with this world-class recognition. Here are AlDub's other awards:

See also

List of fictional supercouples
Notable uses of split-screen
Korean Wave

References

Further reading

Eat Bulaga!
Television characters introduced in 2015
Fictional Filipino people
Soap opera supercouples
Television spin-offs